The 2022 MAC Championship Game was a college football conference championship game played December 3, 2022, at Ford Field in Detroit, Michigan. It was the 26th edition of the MAC Football Championship Game and determined the champion of the Mid-American Conference (MAC) for the 2022 season. The game began at 12:00 p.m. EST and aired on ESPN. The game featured the Western Division champion Toledo Rockets against the Eastern Division champion Ohio Bobcats. For sponsorship reasons, the game is officially known as the Rocket Mortgage MAC Championship.

Toledo won their fourth championship game with a 17-7 win over the Bobcats.

Venue
The 2022 MAC title game was held at Ford Field for the 19th consecutive season. The venue, located in downtown Detroit at 2000 Brush St., is the home of the Detroit Lions of the National Football League (NFL) and has a seating capacity for football of 65,000.

Previous season

The 2021 MAC Championship Game featured Kent State against Northern Illinois. In the championship game, Northern Illinois was victorious by a score of 41–23.  It was the Huskies' fifth win of the championship game and first since 2018.

Teams
The game featured the Ohio Bobcats, champions of the East Division, and the Toledo Rockets, champions of the West Division, of the Mid-American Conference.

Toledo

Toledo clinched a berth in the championship game with two weeks remaining in the schedule following their win over Ball State and a loss by Western Michigan the following night.  This is Toledo's seventh appearance in the championship game.  They are 3–3 in prior attempts having won in their last appearance in 2017

The Rockets were 2–2 out of conference with wins over FCS LIU and UMass and losses at Ohio State and San Diego State.  They opened conference play with 3 consecutive wins over Central Michigan, Northern Illinois, Kent State.  Quarterback Dequan Finn was injured in a loss at Buffalo.  Tucker Gleason led the Rockets to a win over Eastern Michigan and Finn retuned for a win Ball State which wrapped up the division but sat out a loss to Bowling Green.  Toledo ended their regular season with a loss to Western Michigan in which Finn played sparingly

Ohio

Ohio clinched a berth in the championship game during the final week of the season with a 38–14 win over Bowling Green.  They entered the game 9–3 with a 7–1 record in the MAC and on a seven-game winning streak.  This is Ohio's fifth appearance in the game and first since 2016.  They are 0–4 in their previous attempts and have not won a conference championship since 1968.

The Bobcats were 2–2 out of conference with wins over Florida Atlantic and FCS Fordham and losses at power conference foes Penn State and Iowa State.  They opened conference play with an overtime loss to Kent State and a win over last place Akron. Through six games Ohio was surrendering 40.6 points, 561 yards, and 387 passing yards per game but were 3–3 on the season with a prolific offense led by the passing of MAC Player of the Year Kurtis Rourke. 

Ohio finished the regular season with consectutive wins over Western Michigan, Northern Illinois, Buffalo, Miami (OH), Ball State, and Bowling Green during which Ohio surrendered an average of only 18 points per game.  Rourke suffered a season ending torn ACL against Ball State and Ohio turned to third string quarterback CJ Harris.

Game summary

References

Championship
MAC Championship Game
American football competitions in Detroit
MAC Championship
MAC Championship
Ohio Bobcats football games
Toledo Rockets football games